The Guinean People's Union was a political party in Guinea. UPG was founded in April 1958 through the merger of Socialist Democracy of Guinea (DSG, the Guinean branch of the African Socialist Movement) and the African Bloc of Guinea (BAG). UPG was the Guinean branch of the African Regroupment Party (PRA).

The party was dominated by Western-educated Fulas, such as Barry Diawadou, Barry III and Abdoulaye Diallo.

Whilst BAG, one of the founding parties of the UPG, had represented the more conservative political sector in Guinea, the new UPG tried to challenge the dominant African Democratic Rally (RDA) from its left.

UPG supported the 'No'-campaign in the 1958 referendum on Guinea joining the French Community. After the referendum and the subsequent independence of Guinea, UPG was merged into the RDA.

References

Political parties established in 1958
Defunct political parties in Guinea
Communism in Guinea
1958 establishments in Guinea